Erik Bonino (born July 1963) is a former Chairman of Shell UK.

Career
Previous to Shell he worked in the oil industry for eighteen years.

Shell UK
He joined Shell in 2002. Shell UK is headquartered at the Shell Centre. He is a trustee of EngineeringUK. He became Chairman of Shell UK on 1 April 2014.

See also
 Carl-Henric Svanberg, Chairman of BP
 Peter Mather (businessman), Head of BP UK since 2004

References

External links
 Shell UK
 Telegraph November 2014
 Government blog

1963 births
Alumni of Cranfield University
Alumni of the University of Southampton
British businesspeople in the oil industry
British people of Italian descent
People from Hammersmith
People from Henham
Shell plc people
Living people